Tuek Phos is a small town and capital of Tuek Phos District in Kampong Chhnang Province, Cambodia.

Populated places in Kampong Chhnang province
Towns in Cambodia